Sharon Marley Pendergast (born 23 November 1964) is a Jamaican singer, dancer, and curator. She is the biological daughter of Rita Marley and was adopted by Bob Marley when the two married. She was in the group Ziggy Marley and the Melody Makers along with her young sister and brothers. With the group, she has won three Grammy awards.

Career

1980–1999: Early life and The Melody Makers

The Melody Makers was formed at the request of their father, Bob Marley, but only after his death did the band come into their own. Their vision, however, was similar to their father's desire to bring people together through music.  The band is composed of four of Bob Marley's ten children, vocalist/guitarist Ziggy, vocalist/guitarist/drummer Stephen, vocalist Cedella, and vocalist Sharon. Her young brother Ziggy was the group's leader, with Stephen often sharing in the songwriting and lead vocals.

The group released over ten albums which includes their Grammy-winning albums "Conscious Party", "One Bright Day", and "Fallen Is Babylon". They have scored a number one hit "Tumblin' Down" along with other successful singles "Tomorrow People", "Everyone Wants to Be", "Look Who's Dancin'", and "Power to Move Ya".

In 1989, she made an appearance in the movie "The Mighty Quinn" as "Jody". Her song "I'm Hurting Inside", which features Sheryl Lee Ralph and Cedella Marley, appears on the soundtrack.

2002–present: Disbandment of the Melody Makers and recent work
In 2002, the group disbanded after their worldwide tour. Sharon now balances her prowess on stage with the Caribbean business of Ghetto Youth United, the Melody Makers support group, and as the curator of the Bob Marley Museum. She is managing director of Total Care Learning Centre (TCLC) on Lady Musgrave Road in Kingston, Jamaica.

In August 2021, she released her first single "Just One More Morning". In 2022, she released her second single "Butterflies in the Sky".

Personal life
Sharon is married with four children named Donisha, Ingermar, Matthew, and Peter-Shane. She is divorced from her first husband, Jamaican football official Peter Pendergast. In 2014, she married Ghanaian musician Ekow Alabi Savage. She practices yoga and meditates for 15 minutes a day.

Discography
 "Just One More Morning" (2021)
 "Butterflies in the Sky" (2022)

References

External links
 

1964 births
Living people
musicians from Kingston, Jamaica
20th-century Jamaican women singers
Jamaican_people_of_Cuban_descent
Jamaican_reggae_singers
S
Ziggy Marley and the Melody Makers members